This local electoral calendar for the year 2011 lists the subnational elections held in 2011 in the de jure and de facto sovereign states. By-elections and sub-national referendums are also included.

January
2 January: Federated States of Micronesia, Kosrae, Governor and Lieutenant Governor (2nd round)
26 January: Bangladesh, Brahmanbaria-3 and Habiganj-1, House of the Nation by-elections

February
6 February: Brazil, Dourados, 
13 February: Switzerland
Aargau, 
Appenzell Ausserrhoden, 
Basel-Landschaft, 
Basel-Stadt, 
Bern, 
Geneva, referendums
Lucerne, 
Nidwalden, 
Schaffhausen, 
Solothurn, 
St. Gallen, 
Thurgau, 
Uri, 
Zürich, 
20 February: Hamburg (Germany), Parliament
22 February: United States
Chicago, Mayor and City Council (1st round)
Kansas City, MO, Mayor and City Council (1st round)

March
1 March: United States
Oklahoma City, City Council (1st round)
Tampa, Mayor and City Council (1st round)
Wichita, Mayor and City Council (1st round)
2 March: Netherlands, Provincial
3 March: Wales (United Kingdom), Devolution referendum
8 March: 
Federated States of Micronesia, Chuuk, House of Representatives
United States, Los Angeles, City Council (1st round)
12 March: Philippines, Cagayan's 2nd district special election
13 March: Catamarca (Argentina), Governor, Chamber of Deputies and Senate
15 March: United States, Miami-Dade County, Mayor recall election
17 March: Sri Lanka, Local elections
19 March: Jordan, Amman's 1st district, House of Representatives by-election
20 March:
Saxony-Anhalt (Germany), Diet
Chubut (Argentina), Governor and Legislature
20 and 27 March: France, Cantonal elections
22 March: United States
Jacksonville, Mayor and City Council (1st round)
Kansas City, MO, Mayor and City Council (2nd round)
Tampa, Mayor and City Council (2nd round)
26 March: New South Wales (Australia), Parliament
27 March: 
Germany
Baden-Württemberg, Parliament
Frankfurt, 
Rhineland-Palatinate, Parliament
Switzerland, Basel-Landschaft, Executive Council and

April
3 April: Switzerland, Zürich, Executive Council and Cantonal Council
4 April: Jamaica, Saint Catherine South Western, House of Representatives by-election
5 April: United States
Anchorage, Assembly
Chicago, City Council (2nd round)
Colorado Springs, Mayor (1st round) and City Council
Las Vegas, Mayor and City Council (1st round)
Oklahoma City, City Council (2nd round)
St. Louis, Board of Aldermen
Wichita, Mayor and City Council (2nd round)
10 April:
Salta (Argentina), Governor, Chamber of Deputies and Senate
Japan, Local elections (1st phase, Prefectures and Designated cities)
Switzerland, Ticino, Council of State and Grand Council
16 April: Switzerland, Lucerne, Executive Council (1st round) and Cantonal Council
24 April: Japan, Local elections (2nd phase, Municipalities)

May
1 May: Switzerland
Appenzell Innerrhoden

Landsgemeinde
Glarus, 
3 May: United States, Denver, Mayor and City Council (1st round)
5 May: United Kingdom:
Local elections
Wales, National Assembly
Northern Ireland, Assembly
Scotland, Parliament
8 May:
San Juan (Argentina), Referendum
Albania, Local elections
India, Bastar and Kadapa, House of the People by-elections
13 May (results): India:
Assam, Legislative Assembly
Kerala, Legislative Assembly
Pondicherry, Legislative Assembly
Tamil Nadu, Legislative Assembly
West Bengal, Legislative Assembly
14 May: United States
Arlington, Mayor and City Council (1st round)
Austin, City Council (1st round)
Dallas, Mayor and City Council
Fort Worth, Mayor and City Council (1st round)
San Antonio, Mayor and City Council (1st round)
15 May: Switzerland
Aargau, 
Basel-Stadt, 
Bern, 
Fribourg, 
Geneva, referendums
Jura, referendums
Lucerne, 
Schwyz, 
Thurgau, 
Uri, 
Vaud, referendums
Zürich, 
17 May: United States
Colorado Springs, Mayor (2nd round)
Jacksonville, Mayor and City Council (2nd round)
Los Angeles, City Council (2nd round)
18 May: South Africa, municipal elections
21 May: Switzerland, Lucerne, Executive Council (2nd round)
22 May:
Bremen (Germany), Lander parliament
Spain, Local and regional
24 May: United States, Miami-Dade County, Mayor (1st round)
28 May: Philippines, Ilocos Sur's 1st district special election
29 May: La Rioja (Argentina), Governor and Legislature

June
5 June: Switzerland, Ticino, referendums
7 June: United States
Denver, Mayor and City Council (2nd round)
Las Vegas, Mayor and City Council (2nd round)
11 June: United States, San Antonio, City Council (2nd round)
12 June: Neuquén (Argentina), Governor and Legislature
18 June: United States
Arlington, City Council (2nd round)
Austin, City Council (2nd round)
Fort Worth, Mayor and City Council (2nd round)
19 June: Switzerland
Basel-Stadt, 
Neuchâtel, referendums
26 June:
Argentina
Tierra del Fuego, Governor (1st round) and Legislature
Misiones, Governor and House of Representatives
United States, Cherokee Nation, Principal Chief, Deputy Chief and Tribal Council (1st round)
28 June: United States, Miami-Dade County, Mayor (2nd round)

July
1 July: India, Jamshedpur, House of the People by-election
3 July:: Tierra del Fuego (Argentina), Governor (2nd round)
10 July: Buenos Aires City (Argentina), Chief of Government (1st round) and Legislature
23 July: 
Sri Lanka, Local elections
United States, Cherokee Nation, Deputy Chief and Tribal Council (2nd round)
24 July: Santa Fé (Argentina), Governor, Chamber of Deputies and Senate
31 July: Buenos Aires City (Argentina), Chief of Government (2nd round)

August
4 August: United States, Nashville, Mayor and Metropolitan Council (1st round)
7 August: Córdoba (Argentina), Governor and Legislature
16 August: United States, King County, Council (1st round)
24 August: 
Federated States of Micronesia, Chuuk, Governor special election
Seoul (South Korea), free lunch referendum
28 August: Tucumán (Argentina), Governor and Legislature
30 August: United States, Phoenix, Mayor and City Council (1st round)

September
4 September: 
Mecklenburg-Vorpommern (Germany), Diet
Switzerland
Vaud, referendums
Zürich, 
11 September: Germany, Hanover Region, 
Hanover, 
12 September: Norway, Local elections
13 September: United States, Tulsa, City Council (1st round)
15 September: United States, Nashville, Metropolitan Council (2nd round)
18 September:
Argentina
Chaco, Governor and Chamber of Deputies
Corrientes, Chamber of Deputies
Berlin (Germany), House of Representatives
25 September: 
Río Negro (Argentina), Governor and Legislature
Switzerland, Schaffhausen, 
27 September: United States, Boston, City Council (1st round)

October
3 October:
Prince Edward Island (Canada), Legislative Assembly
Northwest Territories (Canada), Legislative Assembly 
4 October:
Manitoba (Canada), Legislative Assembly
United States, Albuquerque, City Council
6 October:
Ontario (Canada), Legislative Assembly
United States, Memphis, Mayor and City Council (1st round)
8 October: Sri Lanka, Local elections
9 October: Madeira (Portugal), Legislative Assembly
11 October:
Newfoundland and Labrador (Canada), House of Assembly
Yukon (Canada), Legislative Assembly
United States, Raleigh, Mayor and City Council
13 October: India, Hisar, House of the People by-election
16 October: Åland (Finland), Lagting
23 October: 
Argentina
Buenos Aires, Governor, Chamber of Deputies and Senate
Entre Ríos, Governor, Chamber of Deputies and Senate
Formosa, Governor and Chamber of Deputies
Jujuy, Governor and Legislature
La Pampa, Governor and Chamber of Deputies
Mendoza, Governor, Chamber of Deputies and Senate
San Juan, Governor and Chamber of Deputies
San Luis, Governor, Chamber of Deputies and Senate
Santa Cruz, Governor and Chamber of Deputies
Switzerland
Appenzell Ausserrhoden, Executive Council, Cantonal Council and 
Jura, referendum
Neuchâtel, Council of State
Obwalden, 
Thurgau, 
Valais, 
30 October: 
Bangladesh, Narayanganj, Mayor and City Corporation
Colombia, Regional

November
1 November: United States
Aurora, CO, Mayor and City Council
Miami, City Commission
6 November: Hong Kong (China), District councils
7 November: Saskatchewan (Canada), Legislative Assembly
8 November: 
Federated States of Micronesia, Pohnpei, Governor and State Legislature
United States of America, Gubernatorial elections
Baltimore, Mayor and City Council
Boston, City Council (2nd round)
Charlotte, Mayor and City Council
Columbus, Mayor and City Council
Houston, Mayor and City Council (1st round)
Indianapolis, Mayor and City-County Council
King County, Council (2nd round)
Philadelphia, Mayor and City Council
Phoenix, Mayor and City Council (2nd round)
Pittsburgh, City Council
San Francisco, Mayor, District Attorney, Sheriff and Referendums
Seattle, City Council
Tucson, Mayor and City Council
Tulsa, City Council (2nd round)
10 November: United States, Memphis, City Council (2nd round)
13 November: Switzerland, Fribourg, Council of State (1st round) and Grand Council
27 November: Switzerland
Aargau, 
Basel-Landschaft, 
Basel-Stadt, 
Geneva, referendums
Lucerne, 
Neuchâtel, referendum
Schwyz, 
St. Gallen, 
Uri, Council of States by-election
Zug, 
Zürich, 
30 November: India, Kolkata Dakshin, House of the People by-election

December
4 December: Switzerland, Fribourg, Council of State (2nd round)
10 December: United States, Houston, City Council (2nd round)
12 December: Syria, Local councils
29 December: Jordan, Karak's 5th district, House of Representatives by-election

References 

2011 elections